Thomas Hillhouse may refer to:

Thomas Hillhouse (American politician) (1817–1897), American farmer, banker and politician
Thomas P. Hillhouse (1898–1991), Canadian politician
Thomas A. Hill House, a 19th-century house in Bangor, Maine, U.S.

See also
 Thomas Hall House, a 19th-century house in Christiansburg, Virginia, U.S.
 Hillhouse (disambiguation)